Lasthenes may refer to:

Lasthenes (Thrace), a town of ancient Thrace
Lasthenes (general), Cretan general
Lasthenes, Olynthian who betrayed his city to Philip II of Macedon for a bribe in 347 BC